Tony Thornton (November 8, 1959 – September 10, 2009 in Camden, New Jersey) was an American professional boxer who died of a motorcycle accident on 10 September 2009. During his career as a professional boxer, Tony fought three times for the world Super Middleweight Championship. Tony attended West Chester University of Pennsylvania.

Thornton was also a Postal Mail Carrier, working for 25 years at Bellmawr Post Office where he became supervisor.

Professional boxing record

|-
|align="center" colspan=8|37 Wins (26 knockouts, 11 decisions), 7 Losses (2 knockouts, 5 decisions), 1 Draw 
|-
| align="center" style="border-style: none none solid solid; background: #e3e3e3"|Result
| align="center" style="border-style: none none solid solid; background: #e3e3e3"|Record
| align="center" style="border-style: none none solid solid; background: #e3e3e3"|Opponent
| align="center" style="border-style: none none solid solid; background: #e3e3e3"|Type
| align="center" style="border-style: none none solid solid; background: #e3e3e3"|Round
| align="center" style="border-style: none none solid solid; background: #e3e3e3"|Date
| align="center" style="border-style: none none solid solid; background: #e3e3e3"|Location
| align="center" style="border-style: none none solid solid; background: #e3e3e3"|Notes
|-align=center
|Loss
|
|align=left| Roy Jones Jr.
|TKO
|3
|30/09/1995
|align=left| Pensacola Civic Center, Pensacola, Florida
|align=left|
|-
|Win
|
|align=left| Darren Zenner
|TKO
|2
|17/01/1995
|align=left| The Blue Horizon, Philadelphia, Pennsylvania
|align=left|
|-
|Win
|
|align=left| Lenzie Morgan
|SD
|10
|07/12/1994
|align=left| The Blue Horizon, Philadelphia, Pennsylvania
|align=left|
|-
|Loss
|
|align=left| James Toney
|UD
|12
|29/10/1993
|align=left| Tulsa Civic Center, Tulsa, Oklahoma
|align=left|
|-
|Win
|
|align=left| Willie Ball
|TKO
|10
|21/09/1993
|align=left| The Blue Horizon, Philadelphia, Pennsylvania
|align=left|
|-
|Win
|
|align=left| Frank Minton
|TKO
|7
|20/06/1993
|align=left| Harrah's Marina, Atlantic City, New Jersey
|align=left|
|-
|Win
|
|align=left| Iceman John Scully
|UD
|10
|16/03/1993
|align=left| The Blue Horizon, Philadelphia, Pennsylvania
|align=left|
|-
|Win
|
|align=left| Melvin Wynn
|SD
|8
|05/02/1993
|align=left| Atlantic City, New Jersey
|align=left|
|-
|Loss
|
|align=left| Chris Eubank
|UD
|12
|19/09/1992
|align=left| Scottish Exhibition and Conference Centre, Glasgow, Scotland
|align=left|
|-
|Win
|
|align=left| Khalif Shabazz
|KO
|1
|11/06/1992
|align=left| Atlantic City, New Jersey
|align=left|
|-
|Win
|
|align=left| Danny Mitchell
|UD
|8
|22/03/1992
|align=left| Harrah's Marina, Atlantic City, New Jersey
|align=left|
|-
|Win
|
|align=left| Fermin Chirino
|UD
|10
|19/11/1991
|align=left| Harrah's Marina, Atlantic City, New Jersey
|align=left|
|-
|Win
|
|align=left| Merqui Sosa
|SD
|10
|16/05/1991
|align=left| Harrah's Marina, Atlantic City, New Jersey
|align=left|
|-
|Win
|
|align=left| Eddie A. Hall
|TKO
|1
|21/01/1991
|align=left| Harrah's Marina, Atlantic City, New Jersey
|align=left|
|-
|Win
|
|align=left| Carl Sullivan
|TKO
|9
|05/11/1990
|align=left| Harrah's Marina, Atlantic City, New Jersey
|align=left|
|-
|Win
|
|align=left| Karema Leota
|TKO
|2
|27/08/1990
|align=left| Harrah's Marina, Atlantic City, New Jersey
|align=left|
|-
|Win
|
|align=left| Dave Tiberi
|TKO
|4
|21/05/1990
|align=left| Harrah's Marina, Atlantic City, New Jersey
|align=left|
|-
|Win
|
|align=left| Ralph "Psycho" Ward
|SD
|10
|12/02/1990
|align=left| The Blue Horizon, Philadelphia, Pennsylvania
|align=left|
|-
|Loss
|
|align=left| Ismael Negron
|RTD
|6
|20/11/1989
|align=left| Pennsylvania Hall, Philadelphia, Pennsylvania
|align=left|
|-
|Win
|
|align=left| Hector Rosario
|UD
|10
|25/09/1989
|align=left| Harrah's Marina, Atlantic City, New Jersey
|align=left|
|-
|Loss
|
|align=left| Steve Collins
|MD
|12
|16/07/1989
|align=left| Harrah's Marina, Atlantic City, New Jersey
|align=left|
|-
|Loss
|
|align=left| Kevin Watts
|UD
|12
|21/03/1989
|align=left| Trump Castle, Atlantic City, New Jersey
|align=left|
|-
|Win
|
|align=left| Mike Tinley
|UD
|12
|10/01/1989
|align=left| Harrah's Marina, Atlantic City, New Jersey
|align=left|
|-
|Win
|
|align=left| Tim Williams
|TKO
|5
|06/10/1988
|align=left| Pennsylvania Hall, Philadelphia, Pennsylvania
|align=left|
|-
|Win
|
|align=left| Jerry Holly
|KO
|3
|28/07/1988
|align=left| The Blue Horizon, Philadelphia, Pennsylvania
|align=left|
|-
|Win
|
|align=left| Tyrone Frazier
|UD
|10
|12/02/1988
|align=left| Resorts Casino Hotel, Atlantic City, New Jersey
|align=left|
|-
|Loss
|
|align=left| Doug DeWitt
|MD
|13
|06/11/1987
|align=left| The Sands, Atlantic City, New Jersey
|align=left|
|-
|Draw
|
|align=left| Stacy McSwain
|PTS
|10
|25/08/1987
|align=left| Bally's Park Place, Atlantic City, New Jersey
|align=left|
|-
|Win
|
|align=left| Darryl Spain
|TKO
|5
|01/06/1987
|align=left| Pennsylvania Hall, Philadelphia, Pennsylvania
|align=left|
|-
|Win
|
|align=left| Basante Blanco
|RTD
|5
|05/03/1987
|align=left| Harrah's Marina, Atlantic City, New Jersey
|align=left|
|-
|Win
|
|align=left| Harry Daniels
|KO
|2
|25/11/1986
|align=left| Harrah's Marina, Atlantic City, New Jersey
|align=left|
|-
|Win
|
|align=left| Horacio Perez
|TKO
|2
|12/08/1986
|align=left| Resorts Casino Hotel, Atlantic City, New Jersey
|align=left|
|-
|Win
|
|align=left| Ernest Jackson
|KO
|2
|16/05/1986
|align=left| The Sands, Atlantic City, New Jersey
|align=left|
|-
|Win
|
|align=left| Cecil Pettigrew
|TKO
|10
|07/02/1986
|align=left| The Sands, Atlantic City, New Jersey
|align=left|
|-
|Win
|
|align=left| David Barrow
|TKO
|2
|05/11/1985
|align=left| The Sands, Atlantic City, New Jersey
|align=left|
|-
|Win
|
|align=left| Sidney Outlaw
|TKO
|6
|05/09/1985
|align=left| The Sands, Atlantic City, New Jersey
|align=left|
|-
|Win
|
|align=left| Tommy Davenport
|TKO
|2
|01/07/1985
|align=left| The Sands, Atlantic City, New Jersey
|align=left|
|-
|Win
|
|align=left| Jerome Johnson
|SD
|6
|04/02/1985
|align=left| The Sands, Atlantic City, New Jersey
|align=left|
|-
|Win
|
|align=left| Thomas Gordon
|TKO
|2
|30/10/1984
|align=left| The Blue Horizon, Philadelphia, Pennsylvania
|align=left|
|-
|Win
|
|align=left| Thomas Gordon
|TKO
|2
|30/08/1984
|align=left| The Sands, Atlantic City, New Jersey
|align=left|
|-
|Win
|
|align=left| Donnie Williams
|KO
|1
|24/07/1984
|align=left| Philadelphia, Pennsylvania
|align=left|
|-
|Win
|
|align=left| Jesse Goodmond
|TKO
|1
|14/06/1984
|align=left| The Sands, Atlantic City, New Jersey
|align=left|
|-
|Win
|
|align=left| Ali Muhammad
|TKO
|4
|27/07/1983
|align=left| Philadelphia, Pennsylvania
|align=left|
|-
|Win
|
|align=left| Jimmy Barham
|KO
|1
|17/07/1983
|align=left| The Sands, Atlantic City, New Jersey
|align=left|
|-
|Win
|
|align=left| Steve Waters
|TKO
|1
|15/06/1983
|align=left| Playboy Hotel and Casino, Atlantic City, New Jersey
|align=left|
|}

References

1959 births
2009 deaths
American male boxers
Super-middleweight boxers
Boxers from New Jersey
Sportspeople from Camden, New Jersey